The Huwwara checkpoint or Huwara checkpoint or Hawara checkpoint (Makhsom Hawara) is a major Israel Defense Forces checkpoint at one of the four main exits of Nablus. It is located south of the city. It was established on October 2000. The facility was named after the nearby village of Huwara.

History
In 2002, the checkpoint was open from morning to evening. Later, it remained open 24 hours a day.
All vehicles were required to have special permits and be searched.

In 2008, renovations were carried out to ease the overcrowding.

Conditions at Hawara were relaxed in July 2009. The checkpoint was opened to allow pedestrians to cross freely without being searched. Palestinian vehicles have sometimes faced only random inspections.

In 2011, Israeli newspapers reported that the IDF would remove the checkpoint. According to the Palestinian human rights organization Al-Haq, the checkpoint is still in use as of 2014. According to Btselem, the checkpoint is infrequently in use.

Violent incidents
On March 24, 2004 a 16-year-old, Hussam Abdo tried to pass through the checkpoint wearing an explosive belt strapped to his body in an attempted suicide attack.

In May 2005, a 15-year-old was arrested at the checkpoint with two pipe bombs inside a black bag, apparently instructed to give them to someone in Israel. In November 2007, two Palestinian teenagers were detained for interrogation after they were found to be carrying three bombs. A sapper detonated them without incident. In September 2008, a Palestinian woman threw acid in a soldier's face, leaving him blind in one eye.

See also
 Palestinian freedom of movement

References

West Bank
Israeli–Palestinian conflict
Checkpoints